Skotselv is a village in the municipality of Øvre Eiker, Norway. Its population (2005) is 684, of which 8 people live within the border of the neighbouring municipality of Modum. It has a railway station on the Randsfjord Line.

History 
Skotselv as a small village has existed since the Viking era. At that time the main river, now called Drammenselva, rose  higher than today's level, making transport and trade by ship highly accessible. The village first started to grow significantly during the first half of the 16th century when the powerful Ulleland family established several sawmills along the river, using the river as a mean of transporting the goods to the region's capital, Drammen.

Iron Mill period
In 1649, Hassel Ironworks (Hassel jernverk) started operation as the area's first iron mill, which was run by the Hassel family . They mainly produced ovens, but expanded into general ironware factory later on. It continued to be the biggest influence on the community until it was finally closed down in 1888.

Cellulose Mill period
Established the same year as the iron mill shut down, the Skotselv Cellulose Mill (Skotselv Cellullosefabrikk)  remained Skotselv's most important workplace. Several modernizations were made during the first part of the 20th century and the company was sold to Labor Union in 1913. The new ownership managed to turn the tide and the growth lasted all the time to 1978 when it was closed for good.

Skotselv Power Station 
Skotselv Power Station (Skotselv Kraftverk) is a hydroelectric dam on the Bingselva. It has installed a Kaplan turbine. The power plant uses the fall in the river. It is owned and operated by Øvre Eiker Energi AS.

Local attractions 
Düvelgården -  historic manor house associated with Hassel jernverk
Bingenselven -  local park suitable for camping and outdoor grilling

Notable people
Timo André Bakken - cross-country skier
Nikolai Eilertsen - bass guitarist
Christopher Hornsrud (1859–1960)-  Prime Minister of Norway from January to February 1928

Picture gallery

References

External links
Skotselvs website
   Photos from Skotselv

Villages in Buskerud
Øvre Eiker